The East Hebei Autonomous Government, also known as the East Ji Autonomous Government and the East Hebei Autonomous Anti-Communist Government, was a short-lived late-1930s state in northern China. It has been described by historians as either a Japanese puppet state or a buffer state.

History

After the creation of Manchukuo and subsequent military action by the Imperial Japanese Army, which brought Northeastern China east of the Great Wall under Japanese control, the Empire of Japan and the Republic of China signed the Tanggu Truce, which established a demilitarised zone south of the Great Wall, extending from Tianjin to Beiping. Under the terms of the truce and the subsequent He-Umezu Agreement of 1935, this demilitarized zone was also purged of the political and military influence of the Kuomintang government of China.

On 15 November 1935, the local Chinese administrator of the 22 counties in Hebei province, Yin Ju-keng, proclaimed the territories under his control to be autonomous. Ten days later, on 25 November, he proclaimed them to be independent of the Republic of China and to have their capital at Tongzhou. The new government immediately signed economic and military treaties with Japan. The Demilitarized Zone Peace Preservation Corps that had been created by the Tanggu Truce was disbanded and reorganized as the East Hebei Army with Japanese military support. The Japanese goal was to establish a buffer zone between Manchukuo and China, but the pro-Japanese collaborationist regime was seen as an affront by the Chinese government and a violation of the Tanggu Truce.

The East Hebei Autonomous government received a response in the form of Gen. Song Zheyuan's Hebei-Chahar Political Government, which was under the Nanjing government, launched on 18 December 1935. Chinese soldiers remained in the area.

In July 1936, a peasant uprising against the East Hebei Autonomous Government broke out in Miyun District. Led by an old Taoist priest, the rebels were organized by the Yellow Sand Society and managed to defeat an East Hebei Army unit that was sent to suppress them. Thereafter, the Imperial Japanese Army mobilized to quell the uprising, defeating the peasant rebels by September. About 300 Yellow Sand insurgents were killed or wounded in the fighting.

The East Hebei government survived the Tongzhou mutiny in late July 1937 before being absorbed into the collaborationist Provisional Government of China in February 1938.

See also
 Demilitarized Zone Peace Preservation Corps
 History of Beijing

References

Sources

Further reading
"China: Next: Hopei". Time. April 5, 1937.
On Hopei Flag

Anti-communism in China
Former countries in Chinese history
Former countries in East Asia
Client states of the Empire of Japan
Second Sino-Japanese War
States and territories established in 1935
States and territories disestablished in 1938